Richard Lester is an American film director based in the United Kingdom.

Richard Lester or Dick Lester may also refer to:
 Richard Lester (art patron), patron of The Lester Prize, an Australian art prize
 Richard Lester (harpsichordist), English harpsichordist and musicologist
 Richard Lester (rower), British rower 
 Richard K. Lester, American nuclear engineer, educator, and author
 Richard Neville Lester, English botanist and chemotaxonomist